Peasant Woman Against a Background of Wheat is an 1890 painting by Vincent van Gogh. Van Gogh went on to paint several versions of this painting.

The painting has changed hands several times.
In 1997, Stephen Wynn paid $47.5 million for the painting.

On October 7, 2005, it was announced that Stephen Wynn had sold the painting along with Gauguin's Bathers to Steven A. Cohen for more than $100 million.

See also
 List of works by Vincent van Gogh
 List of most expensive paintings

References

External links

Paintings by Vincent van Gogh
Paintings of Auvers-sur-Oise by Vincent van Gogh
1890 paintings